Richard Newlove is an English former professional rugby league footballer who played in the 1990s and 2000s. He played at club level for Featherstone Rovers (two spells) (Heritage № 729), Wakefield Trinity Wildcats (Heritage № 1204), Doncaster and the Sheffield Eagles.

Playing career

Club career
Richard Newlove made his début for Featherstone Rovers on Sunday 3 September 1995.

Genealogical information
Richard Newlove is the youngest son of the rugby league footballer John Newlove, and is the youngest brother of the rugby league footballers; Shaun Newlove and Paul Newlove.

References

External links
John Newlove
John Newlove, Shaun Newlove, Paul Newlove and Richard Newlove
Is Superleague predictable and elitist?
Villeneuve march on
Giants continue win streak
Kelly makes winning return
Giants on course for Super League
Huddersfield edge to victory
Huddersfield march on
Wildcats sign up Aussie duo
Halifax to field new signings
Wakefield Trinity Wildcats
Super League: Round Three round-up
Super League: Round 10 round-up
Super League: Round 14 round-up
Bradford back on top
Vikings grab share of spoils
Tigers spoil Bulls party
Newlove back at Rovers
Wakefield Trinity Wildcats
London Sk 6-52 Featherstone
Featherstone 14-80 Bradford

Living people
Doncaster R.L.F.C. players
English rugby league players
Featherstone Rovers players
Place of birth missing (living people)
Rugby league centres
Rugby league players from Pontefract
Rugby league wingers
Sheffield Eagles players
Wakefield Trinity players
Year of birth missing (living people)